Maiky Fecunda (born 4 August 1995) is a Curaçaoan football player who plays for Helmond Sport. He holds Dutch citizenship.

Club career
He made his professional debut in the Eerste Divisie for Helmond Sport on 29 August 2014 in a game against N.E.C.

In July 2019, Fecunda joined RKSV Nuenen.

References

External links
 
 

1995 births
People from Willemstad
Dutch people of Curaçao descent
Living people
Curaçao footballers
Helmond Sport players
Eerste Divisie players
Curaçao international footballers
Association football defenders
RKSV Nuenen players